The Cordillera de la Costa Central is a range of the Venezuelan Coastal Ranges System (Cordillera de la Costa), in northern Venezuela.

Geography
The mountain range runs east— west along the northern Caribbean Sea coast. It is also known as the Central Range.

In the east the Cordillera de la Costa Central follow the border between the states of Vargas and Miranda. They then pass through the states of Aragua and Carabobo, and the eastern part of the state of Yaracuy, and they terminate south of the Yaracuy river in the northern part of the state of Cojedes.

Ecology
Between , the mountains are covered by montane evergreen forests and Cordillera de la Costa montane forests (ecoregion).

The range forms part of an Endemic Bird Area, as designated by Birdlife International.

Venezuelan Coastal Range
Mountain ranges of Venezuela
Mountain ranges of the Andes
Geography of Aragua
Geography of Cojedes (state)
Geography of Carabobo
Geography of Miranda (state)
Geography of Vargas (state)
Geography of Yaracuy